Luca Bruno (born 24 August 1996) is an Italian football player. He plays for  club Grosseto.

Club career
He made his Serie C debut for L'Aquila on 10 April 2016 in a game against Prato.

On 1 November 2018 he returned to Siracusa.

On 15 July 2019, he signed with Rende.

On 19 September 2020 he joined Fano.

On 16 August 2021, he moved to Trapani in Serie D.

References

External links
 

1996 births
Sportspeople from the Province of Brescia
Footballers from Lombardy
Living people
Italian footballers
Brescia Calcio players
F.C. Crotone players
L'Aquila Calcio 1927 players
A.C.R. Messina players
F.C. Pro Vercelli 1892 players
Alma Juventus Fano 1906 players
Trapani Calcio players
F.C. Grosseto S.S.D. players
Serie B players
Serie C players
Serie D players
Association football defenders